London Buses route 360 is a Transport for London contracted bus route in London, England. Running between Royal Albert Hall and Elephant & Castle, it is operated by London Central.

History
The route was the first in London to use hybrid electric buses, with six vehicles built by Wrightbus, branded Electrocity, entering service in February 2006. The trial was announced in March 2005; route 360 was chosen as it is one of few single-deck routes to operate in central London. Six diesel buses were operated alongside the hybrids for comparison. The hybrids were temporarily withdrawn shortly after their introduction following problems with engine overheating.

In November 2009, it was announced that London Central had successfully tendered to retain the route, which would be converted to full hybrid operation using a mixture of new and existing vehicles from 23 January 2010, the first route to use only hybrid vehicles. In August 2014, new passenger information screens were introduced on one bus on the route.

The hybrid buses were replaced by electric Alexander Dennis Enviro200EV single-deckers in November 2017.

References

External links

Bus routes in London
Transport in the Royal Borough of Kensington and Chelsea
Transport in the London Borough of Lambeth
Transport in the London Borough of Southwark
Transport in the City of Westminster